Satrenga also locally known as  Goa of Chhattisgarh is a place and a tourist attraction located in catchment area of southern end of Hasdeo-Bango reservoir approximately  located 36 km northward from Korba, Korba district in Chhattisgarh, India. This place has been developed into an Eco-tourism site by Government of Chhattisgarh. Satrenga is surrounded by Mahadev hills and has many small islands in the middle of reservoir. It is one of Chhattisgarh's most enthralling and peaceful tourist destinations.

 

It is famous for its bluish water, mountains and greenery, Chhattisgarh tourism department has developed the site for water sports and adventurous activities like boating, camping and trekking along with luxury resorts for holiday stay, other tourist attraction there is a mountain called Mahadev Mountain. Satrenga has been a one of preferred shooting locations in Chhattisgarh, many chhattisgarhi regional songs have been shot here.

Gallery

Connectivity

By road 
Nearest bus stand is Korba Bus Terminal from where tourist vehicles/ Cabs can be booked
Raipur Metropolitan Region

By Rail 
Nearest Railway station is Korba railway station

By Air 
Nearest well connected Airport is Raipur Airport which is 255 km from Satrenga

References

Korba, Chhattisgarh
Korba district